Postcolonial Theory and the Specter of Capital is a 2013 book by the Indian sociologist and New York University professor Vivek Chibber.

Coming from the radical Enlightenment tradition, this book is a critique of Postcolonial Theory. 

Chibber focuses on the Subaltern Studies section of the theory, and demonstrates how its foundational arguments are based on a series of political and historical misunderstandings. 

The book received positive reviews from American linguist Noam Chomsky and Slovenian philosopher Slavoj Zizek. It also received a critical response from Indian postcolonial theorist Gayatri Spivak in Cambridge Review of International Affairs to which Chibber replied in the same journal.

Reception
Noam Chomsky termed it a "scrupulous and perceptive analysis", and "a very significant contribution." According to him, Chibber has succeeded in showing that "universalizing categories of Enlightenment thought" emerge unscathed from postcolonial criticism.

Slavoj Zizek also gave it a strong positive review, calling it "the book we were all waiting for." According to Zizek, "this book simply sets the record straight, and puts postcolonialism into its place: at the heart of global Capitalist processes."

According to historian Robert Brenner, "Vivek Chibber has written a stunning critique of postcolonial theory as represented by the Subaltern Studies school."

American quarterly magazine Jacobin called it a "strong case for why we can—and must—conceptualize the non-Western world through the same analytical lens that we use to understand developments in the West."

In its review, Los Angeles Review of Books wrote "Chibber does a good and important job criticizing some of the fundaments of Subaltern Studies. Postcolonial Theory is a book that should be read by all engaging with postcolonial theory".

See also
 David Harvey

References

External links
 Goodreads link
 Internet Archive link to full text

2013 non-fiction books
Postcolonialism
Verso Books books